The Land of Crimson Clouds is a 1959 science fiction novel by Soviet writers Boris and Arkady Strugatsky, the first set in the Noon Universe.

Plot summary
A spaceship, propelled by a prototype photon engine, sets off for Venus, which at that time, is an enigmatic and unexplored planet covered by clouds. The tasks of the crew are a) to test the prototype engine in field conditions and b) to locate and set radio beacons on the so called "Uranium Golconda" (a place with incredibly large heavy metals deposits), presumably, found somewhere on the second planet of the Solar System.

As the crew ventures into the depths of Venus, unknown dangers take them out one by one, so only four of six return home after accomplishing the mission — all badly damaged, both physically and mentally. However, their feat was the first milestone in colonizing Venus and the first step into the 21st century.

Tribute
On 23 July 2019, a Google Doodle was created to commemorate the 60th anniversary of the novel's publication.

References

External links
 

1959 in the Soviet Union
1959 science fiction novels
Soviet science fiction novels
Noon Universe novels
Novels set on Venus
Space exploration novels
1959 debut novels